Wettin-Löbejün is a town in the district Saalekreis, in Saxony-Anhalt, Germany. It was formed on 1 January 2011 by the almagamation of the former municipalities Löbejün, Wettin, Brachwitz, Döblitz, Domnitz, Gimritz, Nauendorf, Neutz-Lettewitz, Plötz and Rothenburg. These former municipalities and Dößel are now the 11 Ortschaften or municipal divisions of the town.

References 

 
Saalekreis